The Three Rules of Discipline and Eight Points for Attention is a military doctrine that was issued in 1928 by Mao Zedong and his associates for the Chinese Red Army, who were then fighting against the Kuomintang. The contents vary slightly in different versions. One of the major distinctions of the doctrine was its respect for the civilians during wartime. The following version is obtained from Stephen Uhalley in 1975.

Statement
The three rules enjoined
 prompt obedience to orders,
 no confiscation of people's property, 
 prompt delivery directly to authorities of all items confiscated from enemy.

The eight points were:
 Be polite when speaking
 Be honest when buying and selling
 Return all borrowed articles
 Pay compensation for everything damaged
 Do not hit or swear at others
 Do not damage crops
 Do not harass females
 Do not mistreat prisoners

Alternate
An alternative, more literal translation into English was presented by the People's Daily.

The Three Main Rules of Discipline:
 Obey orders in all your actions.()
 Do not take a single needle or piece of thread from the masses.()
 Turn in everything captured.()

The Eight Points for Attention:
 Speak politely.()
 Pay fairly for what you buy.()
 Return everything you borrow.()
 Pay for anything you damage.()
 Do not hit or swear at people.()
 Do not damage crops.()
 Do not take liberties with women.()
 Do not ill-treat captives.()

History
These injunctions were usually complied with and, according to historian Stephen Uhalley, came to make the Chinese Red Army a distinctive army in China and an exceptionally popular one. The attitude of the Three Rules and the Eight Points heavily contrasted with the Nationalist Kuomintang armies led by Chiang Kai-shek, who were fighting the Chinese Red Army in the Chinese Civil War. For example, Nationalist armies tended to board in civilian houses without permission, tended to be rude and disrespectful towards civilians, or sometimes even confiscated material from the peasants in order to gain supplies. The Chinese Red Army however, under the Three Points of Discipline and Eight Points of Attention requested permission to take supplies and to board at houses instead, and any confiscation of peasant property were exceptions and violators were promptly punished. For example, Red Army soldiers would be shot on the spot if they were found looting peasant homes.

Many impressed villagers gave supplies and shelter to the Red Army voluntarily, greatly helping their war efforts.  Eventually, many villagers and their sons and daughters joined the Red Army, providing the Red Army with sufficient manpower to combat the Japanese and Kuomintang.

It was common after a confiscation of items from warlords that the items would be redistributed among the people, in addition to supplying the Chinese Red Army.  As a result, the peasants tended to spread disinformation to the Kuomintang when they arrived to pursue the Chinese Red Army, while showing the Chinese Red Army hospitality whenever they arrived at villages. This invariably resulted in attrition of the Kuomintang forces.

This contrasting doctrine in comparison with the Kuomintang inevitably became one of the major reasons for winning most of the Chinese people's support, and thus the victory of the Chinese Red Army over the Kuomintang in 1949. The people's support for the Red Army proved to be more important than the raw manpower that Kuomintang initially enjoyed.

See also
Military anthem of China

References

Cold War history of China
Military doctrines
Military of the People's Republic of China